Euzopherodes charlottae is a species of snout moth in the genus Euzopherodes. It was described by Rebel in 1914. It is found in France, the Czech Republic, Austria, Slovakia, Hungary, Romania, Bulgaria, North Macedonia, Albania and Turkey.

References

Moths described in 1914
Phycitini
Moths of Europe
Moths of Asia